The Al Anbar governorate election of 2013 was held on 20 June 2013 alongside elections for Nineveh.

Background 
Whilst elections for 13 of Iraq's 18 governorates were held on 20 April, elections in the governorates of Al Anbar and Nineveh were delayed due to security concerns arising from the ongoing insurgency and Sunni-led protests.

Campaign

Entities
A total of 17 political parties and coalitions contested the election, fielding a total of 548 candidates. The top four most popular groups were;

Mutahidun (The United)
Mutahidun is a major political force in Ninewa and Anbar, including in its ranks former finance minister Rafia al-Issawi's Future Gathering and tribal leader Ahmed Abu Risha's Awakening (Sahwa) Conference in addition to the Iraqi Islamic Party (IIP). The main leaders of the Mutahidun List were the two Nujaifi brothers; Usama and Atheel. The Nujaifis are not from Al Anbar, however, and so had formed these political alliances to garner more votes. In Anbar, tribal dynamics and locale trump politics and ideology, which, by contrast, are more prominent in Nineveh. The groups composing the Uniters List in Anbar had collectively won 14 seats in the 2009 elections.

Aabiroun Coalition
Aabiroun looked likely to win seats in the run up to the election. Led by then incumbent governor Mohammed Qassim al-Fahdawi, the coalition was composed of nine groups and mostly relied on popular appeal deriving from Fahdawi's tenure as governor.

Arabian Al Iraqia
Deputy Prime Minister Saleh al-Mutlaq competed under the Arab Iraqiyya coalition, consisting of six groups. The al-Hal movement ran as part of the coalition in both Anbar and Ninawa. The two groups had won a total of 9 seats at the previous election, however in the run up to the election Mutlaq had suffered from a declining popularity in Anbar.

Al Iraqia National and United Coalition
The Al Iraqia National and United Coalition is led by former Prime Minister Ayad Allawi and consists of 19 groups. The coalition won two seats in the 2009 elections. The elections will indicate Allawi’s political longevity among Iraqi Sunnis.

Results 
An IHEC spokesman announced the results on 27 June 2013, with the United List led by Iraqi parliamentary speaker Usama al-Nujayfi coming first, with 8 of the 30 seats. The Aabiroun Coalition; a bloc backed by Prime Minister Nour al-Maliki, came second with 5 seats.

Muhammad Mahdi al-Salih, the former Minister of Trade under Saddam Hussein, was rumoured to be a candidate supported by the Uniters List for the position of Governor of Anbar. The Uniters List later denied the rumours.

Ahmed Khalaf Dheyabi, a protest organizer from the Iraqi Islamic Party and a member of the Uniters List, was eventually chosen as the new Governor.

|- style="background-color:#E9E9E9"
!align="left" colspan=2 valign=top|Party/Coalition!! Allied national parties !! Leader !! Seats !! Change !! Votes !! % !! ±%
|-
|bgcolor="#0D4E76"|
|align=left|Muttahidoon ||align=left|al-HadbaNational Future GatheringAnbar Salvation CouncilIraqi Islamic Party || align=left|Usama al-NujayfiRafi al-IssawiAhmed Abu Risha || 8 || 6 || 115,605 || 27.89% || 6.17%
|-
|
|align=left|Aabiroun Coalition || || align=left|Qasim Al-Fahdawi || 5 || || 62,581 || 15.10% ||
|-
|bgcolor="#00009F"|
|align=left|Arabian Al Iraqia || align=left|Iraqi National Dialogue Frontal-Hal  || align=left|Saleh al-Mutlaq || 4 || 5 || 57,332 || 13.83% || 10.56%
|-
|bgcolor="#098DCD"|
|align=left|Al Iraqia National and United Coalition || align=left|Iraqi National Accord || align=left|Ayad Allawi || 3 || 1 ||  39,500 || 9.53% || 2.73%
|-
|
|align=left|Al Anbar United Coalition || || align=left|Kamil al-Dulaymi || 3 || || 35,214 || 8.49% ||
|-
|
|align=left|National Cooperation Coalition || || align=left|Ali Farhan || 2 || || 32,718 || 7.89% ||
|-
|
|align=left|People’s Will Project || || align=left|Sheikh Mohamad Daham Al Farhan || 2 || || 25,210 || 6.08% ||
|-
|
|align=left|Iraq’s Affluents || || align=left|Sheikh Jamal Al Jadaan || 1 || || 10,785 || 2.60% ||
|-
|
|align=left|Amiroun Coalition || || align=left|Ahmad Raja || 1 || || 9,220 || 2.22% ||
|-
|
|align=left|Valiants of Iraq Bloc || || align=left|Sheikh Majed Ali Al Sulayman || 1 || || 8,932 || 2.15% ||
|-
|bgcolor="#F6BE22"|
|align=left|Iraq’s Benevolence and Generosity List || || align=left|Dr Rushdi Said || || || || ||
|-
|bgcolor="#286F42"|
|align=left|Islamic Dawa Party - Iraq Organization || || align=left|Hashim Al-Mosawy || || || || ||
|-
|
|align=left|Arabs’ Frontier || || align=left|Sheikh Karab Bin Ali Al Samrad || || || || ||
|-
|
|align=left|Iraq’s Glory Coalition || || align=left|Iyad Munjed Al Sulayman || || || || ||
|-
|
|align=left|Al Anbar Citizens’ Unified Coalition || || align=left|Abdul Salam Raja Nawaf || || || || ||
|-
|bgcolor="#DDDDDD"|
|align=left|Najem Abdullah Ahmad Saleh ||align=left|Independent || || || || || ||
|-
|colspan=2 align=left| Total || || || 30 || 1 || 414,554 || 100% 
|-
|colspan=8 align=left|Sources: al-Sumaria - al-Anbar Coalitions, ISW, Anbar Final Results - IHEC, Anbar Final Candidate Vote Results - IHEC

References 

2013 Iraqi governorate elections